Surveyor crater is a small crater in Mare Cognitum on the Moon.  The name of the crater was formally adopted by the IAU in 1973.

On April 20, 1967, the Surveyor 3 spacecraft landed within the crater near the east rim. Surveyor 3 was the third lander of the American unmanned Surveyor program sent to explore the surface of the Moon. 

The Apollo 12 astronauts Pete Conrad and Alan Bean landed the Lunar Module (LM) Intrepid north of Surveyor crater on November 19, 1969, and eventually walked over to Surveyor 3. During their descent, Surveyor crater was a major landmark, and is the largest crater at the landing site.  To the west of Surveyor is Head crater.  To the southwest are Bench crater and Sharp crater (now called Sharp-Apollo).  To the south is Halo crater.  A distinct crater on the northeast rim is called Block crater.

References

Impact craters on the Moon
Apollo 12
Surveyor program (NASA)